Super Smash Bros. Slamfest '99, also known as Super Smash Bros. LIVE, was a 1999 promotional event for the launch of the fighting video game Super Smash Bros. for the Nintendo 64, the first game in the franchise. The primary attraction of the event was a staged wrestling match involving costumed versions of characters from the game. Although the match was live-streamed via RealPlayer, the broadcast footage is now considered lost media. Since 2020, a search effort to find a copy of the broadcast has been initiated by video game fans and archivists.

Description 
Slamfest '99 took place at the MGM Grand Adventures Theme Park in Las Vegas on April 24, 1999, from 11:00 AM to 1:00 PM PST. It was announced two days prior by Nintendo of America. The event featured a boxing match involving four costumed versions of characters from the game — Donkey Kong, Mario, Pikachu and Yoshi. The location had interactive gameplay stations showcasing Super Smash Bros. for attendees to preview the game.

The costumes were designed by mascot-crafting company KCL Productions, who had no involvement in the production of Slamfest '99 beyond initially providing the costumes to Nintendo. The costumes were previously used in the North American commercial for Super Smash Bros., as well as various advertisements and Nintendo-related events afterwards.

The wrestling match was live-streamed via RealPlayer G2 from a website linked on nintendo.com.

Zelda 64 Planet described the match as follows:

At the time, Slamfest '99 received coverage by video game magazines N64 Magazine, Planet 64, X64, and Nintendo Magazine System. It was also mentioned on the newspaper The Sacramento Bee. An image of Donkey Kong from the event was published in Steven L. Kent's book The Ultimate History of Video Games (2001).

A rebroadcast of the match was made available for several months after its conclusion, via a downloadable RealPlayer file from the event's official website.

Retrospective interest 
In the years since it took place, Slamfest '99 has maintained an extremely obscure status, even among fans of Super Smash Bros.

On May 11, 2020, André Segers, founder of the GameXplain YouTube channel, vaguely recalled Slamfest '99 on Twitter in response to a tweet about a Super Smash Bros. commercial which featured the same character costumes. Only a handful of photographs and screenshots were known to exist. However, a batch of new images were discovered of the event in February 2023, provided by the show's producer, Ed Espinoza. Archived webpages of the rebroadcast in the Wayback Machine no longer work.

References

External links 
Super Smash Bros. Slamfest '99 on SmashWiki (includes a comprehensive image gallery)
Slamfest '99 on Lost Media Wiki (details the ongoing search effort)

April 1999 events in the United States
Boxing matches
Events in Las Vegas
Lost works
MGM Grand Las Vegas
Super Smash Bros.